Zeyar Lynn (born 1958; also known as Myint Aung) is a Burmese poet and writer. He is one of the most influential living poets in Myanmar, leading the post-modern and language poetry movement in Myanmar. He is based in Yangon. He began writing poems in the ninth grade, and Zeyar Lynn debuted in 1982 with Smoke of Depression. In 2006, he published his second poetry collection, Distinguishing Features.

Works 

 Smoke of Depression (1982)
 Distinguishing Features (2006)
 Real/Life: Prose Poems (2009)
 Kilimanjaro (2010)
 Poetry means Craft (2011)

References

External links 

 

Burmese male poets
20th-century Burmese poets
21st-century Burmese poets
People from Yangon
Living people
1958 births